Phloridosa is a subgenus of the genus Drosophila.

References 

 Phloridosa
Insect subgenera